HD 126271 is a suspected variable star in the northern constellation of Boötes.

References

External links
 HR 5394
 Image HD 126271

Boötes
126271
070414
K-type giants
5394
Suspected variables
Durchmusterung objects